Schaefer is an alternative spelling and cognate for the German word schäfer, meaning 'shepherd', which itself descends from the Old High German scāphare. Variants "Shaefer", "Schäfer" (a standardized spelling in many German-speaking countries after 1880), the additional alternative spelling "Schäffer", and the anglicised forms "Schaeffer", "Schaffer", "Shaffer", "Shafer", and "Schafer" are all common surnames.

Schaefer

Born in 1800–1899
Arnold Schaefer (1819–1883), German historian
Germany Schaefer (1877–1919), American professional baseball player
Jacob Schaefer Sr (1850–1910), American professional billiards player
Jacob Schaefer Jr (1894–1975) American professional billiards player
Jacob Schaefer (composer) (1888–1936), American Jewish composer and conductor
Marie Charlotte Schaefer (1874-1927), American physician
Rudolph Jay Schaefer I (1863–1923), American businessman

Born in 1900–1949
Fred K. Schaefer (1904-1953), German and American geographer
Walter V. Schaefer (1904-1986), American jurist and educator
Vincent Schaefer (1906–1993), American chemist and meteorologist who developed cloud seeding
Jack Warner Schaefer (1907–1991), American fiction author
Milner Baily Schaefer (1912–1970), American fisheries biologist
William Donald Schaefer (1921–2011), American politician
Udo Schaefer (born 1926), German Bahá'í author
Will Schaefer (1928–2007), American composer 
Bill Schaefer (field hockey) (1925-2003), New Zealand field hockey player 
Kermit Schaefer (1923–1979), American writer, broadcast and Pardon My Blooper record series producer
Daniel Schaefer (1936–2006), American politician
James Schaefer (1938-2018), American politician and rancher
Bob Schaefer (born 1944), American professional baseball coach
Henry F. Schaefer, III (born 1944), American computational and theoretical chemist, academic and Protestant educator
Gerard John Schaefer (1946–1995), American killer, rapist, and suspected serial killer
Ronald P. Schaefer (born 1945), American academic linguist and university professor.

Born after 1950
Vic Schaefer (born 1961), American basketball coach
Peter Schaefer (ice hockey) (born 1977), Canadian professional ice hockey player
Jarrett Schaefer (born 1979), America film director and screenwriter
Nolan Schaefer (born 1980), Canadian professional ice hockey player
Bradley E. Schaefer (living), American physics academic
Kurt Schaefer (living), American academic
Peter Schaefer (author) (living), American academic and religious history author
Laura Schaefer (disambiguation), multiple people

Schaeffer

Schäfer

Born after 1800
Wilhelm Schäfer (1868–1952), German Naturalist writer and magazine publisher
Dirk Schäfer (1873–1931), Dutch pianist and composer
Karl Emil Schäfer (1891–1917), German World War I pilot, recipient of the Pour le Mérite

Born after 1900
Emanuel Schäfer (1900–1974), officer in the German SS, head of Serbian security police during World War II
Gustav Schäfer (rower) (1906–1991), German Olympic rower
Karl Schäfer (1909–1976), Austrian Olympic figure skater
Ernst Schäfer (1910–1992), German hunter, zoologist and ornithologist
Willy Schäfer (handball player) (1913–1980), Swiss Olympic field handball player
Paul Schäfer (1921–2010), German-Chilean cult leader
Hans Schäfer (born 1927), German retired footballer
Karl Heinz Schäfer (1932–1996), German-born composer and arranger working in France
Willy Schäfer (born 1933), German actor
Hans-Bernd Schäfer (born 1943), German economist and scholar
Manfred Schäfer (born 1943), German-Australian retired professional footballer
Wolfgang Schäfer (born 1945), German choral conductor and academic

Born after 1950
Winfried Schäfer (born 1950), German football manager
Anita Schäfer (born 1951), German politician
Axel Schäfer (born 1952), German politician
Dagmar Schäfer (born 1968), German sinologist and historian of science
Klaus Schäfer SAC (born 1958), German catholic Theologian, Priest and Author
Michael Schäfer (born 1959), Danish football manager
Markus Schäfer (born 1961), German tenor
Thomas Schäfer (1966−2020) German lawyer and politician, Minister of Finance in Hesse
Bärbel Schäfer (born 1963), German television presenter
Christine Schäfer (born 1965), German soprano
Jan Schäfer (born 1974), German Olympic canoer
Raphael Schäfer (born 1979), German footballer
Marcel Schäfer (born 1984), German footballer
András Schäfer (born 1999), Hungarian footballer

Schäffer

Born after 1800
Saint Anna Schäffer (1882–1925), German mystic, canonized by Pope Benedict in 2012
Charles Schäffer (1838–1903), American physician and botanist
Fritz Schäffer (1888–1967), German politician
Julius Schäffer (1882–1944), German mycologist
Mary T. S. Schäffer (1861–1939), American naturalist, illustrator, and explorer in Canada

Born after 1950
Andreas Schäffer (born 1984), German footballer

Schafer

Born after 1800
Edward Albert Sharpey-Schafer (1850–1935), formerly Edward Albert Schäfer, English physiologist

Born after 1900
Natalie Schafer (1900–1991), American actress
Harold Schafer (1912–2001), American entrepreneur
Alice Turner Schafer (1915–2009), American mathematician
Richard D. Schafer (1918–2014), American mathematician
Roy Schafer (1922–2018), American psychologist-psychoanalyst
R. Murray Schafer (born 1933), Canadian composer, writer, music educator and environmentalist
Ronald W. Schafer (born 1938), American electrical engineer and academic
Ed Schafer (born 1946), American state politician and United States Secretary of Agriculture
William J. Schafer (born 1948), Actor in film and on Stage
Born after 1950

Avi Schafer (born 1998), Japanese professional basketball player 
Tim Schafer (born 1967), American computer game designer
Arthur Schafer (living), Canadian ethicist and academic
Eric Schafer (born 1977), American mixed martial artist
Jordan Schafer (born 1986), American baseball player
Hunter Schafer (born 1999),  American model, activist, and actress
Sakura Schafer-Nameki, German physicist

Schaffer

Born after 1800
Károly Schaffer (1864–1939), Hungarian anatomist and neurologist
Alfréd Schaffer (1893–1945), Hungarian footballer

Born after 1900
Jimmie Schaffer (born 1936), American professional baseball player
Janne Schaffer (born 1945), Swedish songwriter and guitarist

Born after 1950
Simon Schaffer (born 1955), English academic
Frank Schaffer (born 1958), retired East German Olympic athlete
Bob Schaffer (born 1962), American state politician
Jon Schaffer (born 1968), American guitarist and songwriter
Daniel Schaffer (born 1969), British graphic novelist
Akiva Schaffer (born 1977), American comedy writer and songwriter
Denny Schaffer (living), American radio personality
Gail Schaffer (living), American state politician
Ken Schaffer (living), American inventor
Lewis Schaffer (born 1957), American comedian
Jonathan Schaffer (living), American-Australian philosopher

Shafer

Born after 1800
Jacob K. Shafer (1823–1876), American national politician
Orator Shafer (1851–1922), American professional baseball player
John Adolph Shafer (1863–1918), American botanist
Taylor Shafer (1866–1945), American professional baseball player
George F. Shafer (1888–1948), American state politician
Tillie Shafer (1889–1962), American professional baseball player
Phil Shafer (1891–1971), American racecar driver
Paul W. Shafer (1893–1954), American national politician

Born after 1900
Raymond P. Shafer (1917–2006), American state politician
Whitey Shafer (1934–2019), American country songwriter and musician
Ruth Shafer (1912 – 1972), American engineer

Born after 1950
Ross Shafer (born 1954), American comedian and motivational speaker
Robert R. Shafer (born 1958), American actor
Dirk Shafer (born 1962), American model, actor, screenwriter and director
Scott Shafer (born 1967), American college football coach
David Shafer (politician) (born 1965), American state politician
Glenn Shafer (living), American mathematician, co-developer of Dempster-Shafer theory
Jack Shafer (living), American journalist and columnist
Jeremy Shafer (living), American entertainer and oragamist
Justin Shafer (born 1992), American baseball player

Shaffer

Born after 1800
Shaffer (baseball), baseball player
John Shaffer (politician) (1827–1870), American territorial governor
Joseph Crockett Shaffer (1880–1958), American national politician
Harry G. Shaffer (politician) (1885–1971), American state politician

Born after 1900
Anthony Shaffer (writer) (1926–2001), English playwright, novelist, and screenwriter
David Shaffer (born 1936), American physician
Earl Shaffer (1918–2002), American outdoorsman and author
Elaine Shaffer (1925–1973), American flutist
Harry G. Shaffer (1919-2009), Austrian-American economics academic
Jack Shaffer (1909–1963), American professional basketball player
James Shaffer (1910–2014), American religious leader
Jay C. Shaffer (born 1936-) entomologist, curator of lepidoptera at the Natural History Museum, London
Jim G. Shaffer (born 1944), American archeology and anthropology academic
John H. Shaffer (1919–1997), American government administrator
Juliet Popper Shaffer (born 1932), American psychologist and statistician
Lee Shaffer (born 1939), American professional basketball player
Leland Shaffer (1912–1993), American professional football player
Louise Shaffer (born 1942), American actress, script writer, and author
Tim Shaffer (1945-2011), American politician
Mary Shaffer (born 1947), American artist
Paul Shaffer (born 1949), Canadian-American musician, actor, author, comedian and composer
 Sir Peter Shaffer (1926–2016), English dramatist and playwright
Robert H. Shaffer (1915–2017), American educator

Born after 1950
Anthony Shaffer (intelligence officer) (born 1962), American Reserve Army Lieutenant Colonel and CIA intelligence officer
Erica Shaffer (born 1970), American actress
James Shaffer (born 1970), American guitarist*Matthew Shaffer (born 1978), American musical theatre, television, and film actor
Brian Shaffer (born 1979), missing American medical student
Kevin Shaffer (born 1980), American professional football player
Atticus Shaffer (born 1998), American actor
Justin Shaffer (born 1998), American football player
Brenda Shaffer (living), American political science author
Chris Shaffer (living), American singer-songwriter
Deborah Shaffer (living), American filmmaker

See also

Shafer Valve Company
Schafferer
Schieffer
Sheaffer
Shepherd (surname)

References

Occupational surnames
German-language surnames
Jewish surnames